Habrocestum superbum is a jumping spider species in the genus Habrocestum that lives in Zimbabwe. It was first described by Wanda Wesołowska in 2000.

References

Endemic fauna of Zimbabwe
Salticidae
Spiders of Africa
Spiders described in 2000
Taxa named by Wanda Wesołowska